Bessora (born 1968, Brussels, Belgium) is a novelist and short story writer. After a career in international finance in Geneva, she studied anthropology and wrote her first novel. Since 1999 Bessora has published a book a year on average, mainly through the publishing group Gallimard. Her books have been translated into several languages.

Biography
Because of her numerous stays abroad (Belgium, Switzerland, Austria, France, the United States, Gabon) and her varied origins (Gabon, Switzerland, France, Germany, Poland), Bessora's writing possesses a free, demanding, and unclassifiable character.

Having first dreamed of being a stewardess, Bessora later attended the HEC Lausanne, and then the Paris Dauphine University. After obtaining a degree in management and a master's degree in applied economics, she worked in finance before changing course. Following a journey in South Africa, she studied anthropology in Paris, before publishing her first novel in 1999. She obtained a doctorate in anthropology in 2002, and continued to write novels. She has been compared to Raymond Queneau, and Nathalie Sarraute.

She was awarded the Fénéon Prize in 2001 for her novel Ink Stains, and the Grand prix littéraire d'Afrique noire in 2007 for her novel Pick Me Pretty Sirs...

Selected novels
 53 cm, Le Serpent à Plumes, Paris, 1999
 Les Taches d'encre (Ink Stains), Le Serpent à Plumes, Paris, 2000 – (Fénéon Prize)
 Deux bébés et l'addition (Two Babies and the Bill), Le Serpent à Plumes, Paris, 2002
 Petroleum, Denoël, Paris, 2004
 Cueillez-moi jolis messieurs... (Pick Me Pretty Sirs...), Gallimard, Paris, 2007 – (Grand prix littéraire d'Afrique noire)
 Et si Dieu me demande, dites-Lui que je dors (If God Asks, Tell Him I'm Sleepling), Gallimard, Paris, 2008

Short stories
7 secondes plus au nord (7 Seconds North ), Nouvelle Revue Française n° 587, Gallimard, 2008.
Bionic Woman, Les Balançoires (Ananda Devi (ed.)), éditions Tropiques, Yaoundé, 2006.
 Le cru et le cuit, adaptation of Claude Lévi-Strauss's Le cru et le cuit, in Dernières nouvelles du colonialisme, Vent d'ailleurs, 2006
 Les Compagnies Low-Cost (Low-Cost Companies), in Nouvelles Mythologies, Éditions du Seuil, Paris, 2007
 Courant d'air aux Galeries (Drafts in Galleries), Eden productions, Paris, 2003

References

Sources
"Bessora, a Writer with a Thirty-Eight Shoe Size", Adele King, in Wasafiri, 1747–1508, Volume 24, Issue 2, 2009, pp. 60–65.
 "Bessora", in World Literature Today, Volume 75, 77, 79, 81 (2002, 2003, 2005, 2007).
 "Bessora", in The French Review, Eilene Hoft-March, May 2009.
 Bessora, at the Berlin International Literature Festival

Living people
Writers from Brussels
Gabonese writers
Swiss writers in French
21st-century Swiss novelists
Swiss women short story writers
Swiss short story writers
21st-century Belgian women writers
Swiss women writers
1968 births
Swiss women novelists
Belgian women novelists
Belgian women short story writers
Belgian short story writers
20th-century Belgian novelists
21st-century Belgian novelists
20th-century short story writers
21st-century short story writers
20th-century Belgian women writers
Prix Fénéon winners
21st-century Gabonese people